El vuelo de la paloma  (English: The Flight of the Dove) is a 1989 Spanish film directed by José Luis García Sánchez and written by Rafael Azcona and García Sánchez.

Principal cast
Ana Belén as Paloma
José Sacristán as Pepe
Juan Luis Galiardo as Luis Doncel
Juan Echanove as Juancho
Antonio Resines as Toñito
Miguel Rellán as Miguel
Luis Ciges as Columela
Manuel Huete as Ciri
José María Cañete as Cañete
Amparo Valle as Paula

Awards and nominations

Nominated
Goya Awards
Best Actor in a Supporting Role (Juan Echanove)
Best Actor in a Supporting Role (Juan Luis Galiardo)
Best Actor in a Supporting Role (Manuel Huete)
Best Actress in a Leading Role (Ana Belén)
Best Screenplay – Original (Rafael Azcona and José Luis García Sánchez)

1989 films
Spanish comedy films
1980s Spanish-language films
Films directed by José Luis García Sánchez
Films with screenplays by Rafael Azcona
1980s Spanish films